The 1947 Redlands Bulldogs football team was an American football team that represented the University of Redlands as a member of the Southern California Conference (SCC) during the 1947 college football season. Under longtime head coach Cecil A. Cushman, the team compiled a 6–3 record (4–0 against SCC opponents) and lost a close game to Hawaii in the fourth annual Pineapple Bowl on January 1, 1948. The team divided its home games between the Orange Show Stadium in San Bernardino, California, and a site on the school's campus in Redlands, California.

End Stan Flowers ranked as the top pass receiver during the 1947 season among small college players with 44 receptions for 493 yards. Halfback Ted Runner ranked second among the country's small college players with 942 passing yards (84 completions out of 150 passes). Runner was a second-team honoree on the Little All-America team who later became the school's football coach and athletic director. In 1988, the school's football stadium was named in his honor.

Schedule

References

Redlands
Redlands Bulldogs football seasons
Southern California Intercollegiate Athletic Conference football champion seasons
Redlands Bulldogs football